This was a new event on the ITF Women's Circuit. Irina Falconi and Nicole Melichar won the tournament, defeating Sanaz Marand and Ashley Weinhold in the all-American final, 4–6, 6–3, [10–8].

Seeds

Draw

References 
 Draw

Oregon Challenger - Doubles